Hunte is a surname. Notable people with the surname include:

Conrad Hunte, West Indian cricketer
Heather Hunte (born 1959), British actress
Julian Hunte (born 1940), foreign minister of Saint Lucia
Neville Hunte (born 1948), Guyanese cyclist
O. D. Hunte, British record producer
Terry Hunte (born 1962), Barbadian cricketer
Torino Hunte (born 1990), Dutch footballer